Ordinary Seaman Peter Cotton (born 1839) was an American soldier who fought in the American Civil War. Cotton received the country's highest award for bravery during combat, the Medal of Honor, for his action aboard the USS Baron DeKalb during the Yazoo Pass Expedition between 23 and 27 December 1862. He was honored with the award on 3 April 1863.

Biography
Cotton was born in New York, New York in 1839. He enlisted into the United States Navy.

Medal of Honor

See also

List of American Civil War Medal of Honor recipients: A–F

References

1839 births
People of New York (state) in the American Civil War
Union Army officers
United States Army Medal of Honor recipients
American Civil War recipients of the Medal of Honor
Military personnel from New York City
Year of death missing